Michele Zalopany (born 1955) is an American artist, known in particular for her large-scale pastel paintings. Zalopany exhibited in the 1989 Whitney Biennial.

Collections
Zalopany's work is included in the collections of the Whitney Museum of American Art, the San Francisco Museum of Modern Art, and the National Gallery of Art, Washington DC.

References

External links
Official website

Living people
1955 births
20th-century American artists
20th-century American women artists
21st-century American women artists
21st-century American artists